Zoe Bäckstedt (born 24 September 2004) is a Welsh professional racing cyclist riding for UCI Women's World Tour Team , competing across road, cyclo-cross and track racing disciplines. At the 2021 UCI Road World Championships, Bäckstedt won the gold medal in the junior women's road race, and silver in the junior women's time trial. A year later, she upgraded junior time-trial silver to gold, winning the event by over a minute and a half before successfully defending her road race title with a dominant solo victory, and her third road world championship at junior level. At the 2022 UCI Cyclo-cross World Championships, Bäckstedt won a second world junior title, this time in the cyclo-cross discipline and completed a hat-trick of world titles across three different disciplines, winning the Madison at the 2022 UCI Junior Track Cycling World Championships. Bäckstedt is a three time European junior champion on the track and a junior European cyclo-cross champion.

In 2022, at the age of 17, Bäckstedt signed with UCI Women's World Tour Team 

Bäckstedt's mother, Megan Hughes, and father, Magnus, are both former professional cyclists, and her sister Elynor also rides professionally.

Major results

Cyclo-cross

2020–2021
 1st  Overall UCI Junior World Cup
1st Tábor
2021–2022
 1st  UCI World Junior Championships
 1st  UEC European Junior Championships
 Ethias Cross
1st Essen
2nd Meulebeke
 Stockholm Weekend
1st Täby Park
1st Stockholm
 2nd Overall UCI Junior World Cup
1st Tábor
1st Namur
1st Dendermonde
 Junior Superprestige
1st Gieten
 Junior X²O Badkamers Trophy
1st Lille
 3rd Gullegem
2022–2023
 1st  National Championships
 UCI World Championships
2nd  Under-23 race
2nd  Team relay
 Coupe de France
2nd Nommay II

Road

2021
 UCI World Junior Championships
1st  Road race
2nd  Time trial
 1st  Time trial, National Junior Championships
 5th Overall Watersley Challenge Juniors
1st  Youth classification
1st Stage 2 (ITT)
2022
 UCI World Junior Championships
1st  Road race
1st  Time trial
 National Junior Championships
1st  Road race
1st  Time trial
 1st  Overall EPZ Omloop van Borsele Juniors
1st  Points classification
1st Stages 1 (ITT) & 3
 1st  Overall Watersley Challenge Juniors
1st  Mountains classification
1st Stages 1, 2 (ITT) & 3

Track

2021
 UEC European Junior Championships
1st  Individual pursuit
1st  Madison (with Millie Couzens)
1st  Team pursuit
2022
 1st  Madison (with Grace Lister), UCI World Junior Championships

Mountain Bike

2021
 3rd Cross-country, National Junior Championships

References

External links

2004 births
Living people
Welsh female cyclists
Place of birth missing (living people)
Welsh people of Swedish descent